Levakant (Kalininabad (Калилининобод) until February 1996, Sarband (Сарбанд) until January 2018), is a city in south-west Tajikistan. It is part of Khatlon Region, located just east of the regional capital Bokhtar and about 120 km south of the national capital Dushanbe. The Golovnaya Dam on the river Vakhsh lies directly to its east.

Its population is estimated at 17,700 for the city proper and 48,300 for the city with the outlying communities (2020).

Levakant is home to Tajikistan's only fertilizer manufacturing plant, Tajik Azot.

Climate
Levakant has a hot-summer Mediterranean climate (Köppen climate classification Csa).

Subdivisions
Before ca. 2018, Levakant was the seat of Sarband District, which covered the present city of Levakant. The city of Levakant covers Levakant proper and two jamoats. These are as follows:

See also
List of cities in Tajikistan

References

Populated places in Khatlon Region